() was a one-off music competition, held by the German broadcaster Norddeutscher Rundfunk (NDR) on 20 May 2006 in Hamburg, Germany. Its aim was to determine the best song in the history of the Eurovision Song Contest by means of an opinion poll. 

Twenty songs were selected to participate in the competition through an online poll, which included all winners of the Eurovision Song Contest and all German Eurovision entries between 1956 and 2005 (103 in total). During the live broadcast on the television channel Das Erste, "Wild Dances" by Ruslana was chosen as the winner, ahead of well-known Eurovision classics such as "Waterloo" and "Ein bißchen Frieden". The programme was viewed by a television audience of approximately six million people in Germany.

Participants
The top twenty Eurovision acts voted for in an online poll participated in the live show. None of the acts were performed live; videos of their original performances in their respective years were shown to the viewers instead. After all twenty songs had been shown, the German public could vote for their favourite song through televoting or via the online poll. All votes were combined to determine the final results. At the end of the show, "Wild Dances" by Ruslana was announced as the winner, having received a total of 71,209 votes.

See also
Songs of Europe (1981)
Congratulations: 50 Years of the Eurovision Song Contest (2005)
Eurovision Song Contest's Greatest Hits (2015)
Der kleine Song Contest (2020)
Eurovision 2020 – das deutsche Finale (2020)
Eurovision: Come Together (2020)
Free European Song Contest (2020)
Sveriges 12:a (2020)

Notes

References

Television shows about the Eurovision Song Contest
Nostalgia television shows
May 2006 events in Europe
Events in Hamburg
2000s in Hamburg
2006 in Germany
2006 in music